Nancy Rachel November is a New Zealand academic, and is professor of musicology at the University of Auckland, specialising in late eighteenth and nineteenth century chamber music.

Academic career 

After a BSc in mathematics in 1994 and a Bachelor of Music with honours in musicology a year later, both from Victoria University of Wellington, November travelled to Cornell University to complete an MA in 1999 and a 2003 PhD titled Haydn's vocality and the ideal of “true” string quartets. November studied baroque violin with Peter Walls and received instruction from the New Zealand String Quartet. November moved to the University of Auckland, rising to full professor in 2022.

November is interested in the socio-cultural context of historical music. In 2020 November was awarded a Marsden grant to investigate the lives of 19th century amateur women musicians, playing scaled-down versions of orchestral pieces in the home. She has also published on cross-disciplinary history pedagogy.

November has been a Humboldt Fellow, and in 2020 was awarded a Humboldt Alumni Award for Innovative Networking Initiatives, for a project aimed at "advanc[ing] music history research from Australasian and East Asian perspectives and link[ing] it with German approaches with the aim of developing a cross-cultural musicology". In 2022 she became vice president of the New Zealand Association of von Humboldt Fellows.

Selected works 
Books
 
 
 
 
 
 
 
Scholarly articles

References

External links 
 November's inaugural professorial lecture in September 2022
 Soundtrack to my life: Nancy November (New Zealand Herald, paywall)

New Zealand women academics
Victoria University of Wellington alumni
Cornell University alumni
New Zealand musicologists
Academic staff of the University of Auckland
Year of birth missing (living people)
Living people